Francis Macdonogh  (1806 – 18 April 1882) was an Irish politician and barrister.

Macdonogh was admitted to the bar in 1829, and made a member of the Queen's Counsel in 1842, later becoming counsel to Inland Revenue for Ireland for 1858 to 1859. He was also a Justice of the Peace for County Armagh, County Kilkenny and County Sligo.

Macdonogh first stood for election as a Whig in Carrickfergus in 1857, but was unsuccessful. He was later elected as th Member of Parliament (MP) for Sligo Borough at a by-election in 1860 – caused by Arthur John Wayne's resignation – and held the seat until 1868 when he was defeated.

References

External links
 

1806 births
1882 deaths
Irish Conservative Party MPs
UK MPs 1859–1865
Members of the Parliament of the United Kingdom for County Sligo constituencies (1801–1922)